Radu Vasile (10 October 1942 – 3 July 2013) was a Romanian politician, historian, and poet.

Originally a member of the Christian Democratic National Peasants' Party (PNȚ-CD), Vasile served as the Prime Minister of Romania between 17 April 1998 and 13 December 1999, and was notably confronted with the last Mineriad (more specifically the February 1999 Mineriad). Subsequently, between 2000 and 2004, he was elected as a Senator on behalf  the Democratic Party (PD). In addition to his political career, Vasile published poetry under the pen name Radu Mischiu.

Biography
Vasile was born in Sibiu in 1942, and was raised in the Roman Catholic faith. In 1967, he graduated from the Faculty of History at the University of Bucharest. For political reasons (his father having been a political prisoner, a lawyer, deceased in 1986), he was barred access to higher education immediately after graduating school..  In 1971 he became a teaching assistant at the Faculty of Economic History at the Bucharest Academy of Economic Studies (ASE). In 1977 he obtained a Ph.D. in Economics from ASE, and in 1978 he became a lecturer at this institution.

After the Romanian Revolution of 1989, Vasile was elected (with student  support) Vice Dean of the Faculty of Commerce at ASE, a position he held until 1992. After 1990 he took refresher studies in European Integration at Thessaloniki and Munich. In 1994 he became a Professor at ASE.

He died of colon cancer in Bucharest in 2013, and was buried at the city's Bellu Cemetery.

Political activity 
He became a member of the Christian Democratic National Peasants' Party (PNȚ-CD) in January 1990. On the party line, Radu Vasile gradually advanced as follows: head of department (Studies Department), alternate member of BCCC after the Christian Democratic National Peasants' Party (PNȚ-CD) congress in September 1991, spokesman since 1991, senator from Bacău since 1992, Secretary General after the Congress from 1996. Between 1993 and 1994, he was the director of the newspaper "Dreptatea".

Since 1993, he has been vice-president of the Senate of Romania and vice-president of the Senatorial Budget-Finance Commission (commission for budget, finance, banking and capital market). In the 1996–2000 legislature, Radu Vasile was a member of the parliamentary friendship groups with the Russian Federation and the State of Israel. In the 2000–2004 legislature, Radu Vasile was a member of the parliamentary friendship groups with UNESCO and the Lebanese Republic. Radu Vasile initiated 2 legislative proposals, of which 1 was enacted law.

In terms of foreign policy, Radu Vasile also had an important activity, being a founding member of the Central European Forum, along with Raymond Barre (former Prime Minister of France), Helmut Schmidt (former Chancellor of Germany), and others.

He lectured on Romanian history at the "Doctoral Schools" at the Sorbonne and gave over 50 scientific papers at academic sessions in the country and abroad.

Radu Vasile was a senator in the 1992–1996, 1996–2000, and 2000–2004 legislatures, last time elected on the lists of the Democratic Party (PD); he was a member of the parliamentary friendship groups with Lebanon and UNESCO. As Prime Minister, he was confronted with the Mineriad of February 1999, solved by the so-called Peace of Cozia.

References

External links
 

1942 births
2013 deaths
Democratic Liberal Party (Romania) politicians
Christian Democratic National Peasants' Party politicians
People from Sibiu
Romanian Roman Catholics
Prime Ministers of Romania
Romanian male poets
Deaths from colorectal cancer
Deaths from cancer in Romania
Burials at Bellu Cemetery
20th-century Romanian poets
20th-century Romanian male writers
University of Bucharest alumni
Academic staff of the Bucharest Academy of Economic Studies
Bucharest Academy of Economic Studies alumni
Romanian economists
Mineriads
20th-century Romanian historians